Meganeura is a genus of extinct insects from the Late Carboniferous (approximately 300 million years ago). They resembled and are related to the present-day dragonflies and damselflies, and were predatory, with their diet mainly consisting of other insects. The genus belongs to the Meganeuridae, a family including other similarly giant dragonfly-like insects ranging from the Late Carboniferous to Middle Permian.

Fossils of Meganeura were first discovered in Late Carboniferous (Stephanian) Coal Measures of Commentry, France in 1880. In 1885, French paleontologist Charles Brongniart described and named the fossil "Meganeura" (large-nerved), which refers to the network of veins on the insect's wings. Another fine fossil specimen was found in 1979 at Bolsover in Derbyshire. The holotype is housed in the National Museum of Natural History, in Paris. Despite being the iconic "giant dragonfly", fossils of Meganeura are poorly preserved in comparison to other meganeurids.

Lifestyle 

Research on close relatives Meganeurula and Meganeurites suggest that Meganeura was adapted to open habitats, and similar in behaviour to extant hawkers. The eyes of Meganeura were likely enlarged relative to body size. Meganeura had spines on the tibia and tarsi sections of the legs, which would have functioned as a "flying trap" to capture prey. An engineering examination estimated that the mass of the largest specimens with wingspans over 70 cm to be 100 to 150 grams. The analysis also suggested that Meganeura would be susceptible to overheating.

Size
There has been some controversy as to how insects of the Carboniferous period were able to grow so large.
 Oxygen levels and atmospheric density. The way oxygen is diffused through the insect's body via its tracheal breathing system puts an upper limit on body size, which prehistoric insects seem to have well exceeded. It was originally proposed by  that Meganeura was able to fly only because the atmosphere of Earth at that time contained more oxygen than the present 20 percent. This hypothesis was initially dismissed by fellow scientists, but has found approval more recently through further study into the relationship between gigantism and oxygen availability. If this hypothesis is correct, these insects would have been susceptible to falling oxygen levels and certainly could not survive in our modern atmosphere. Other research indicates that insects really do breathe, with "rapid cycles of tracheal compression and expansion". Recent analysis of the flight energetics of modern insects and birds suggests that both the oxygen levels and air density provide an upper bound on size. The presence of very large Meganeuridae with wing spans rivaling those of Meganeura during the Permian, when the oxygen content of the atmosphere was already much lower than in the Carboniferous, presented a problem to the oxygen-related explanations in the case of the giant dragonflies. However, despite the fact that Meganeurids had the largest-known wingspans, their bodies were not very heavy, being less massive than those of several living Coleoptera; therefore, they were not true giant insects, only being giant in comparison with their living relatives.
 Lack of predators. Other explanations for the large size of Meganeurids compared to living relatives are warranted.  suggested that the lack of aerial vertebrate predators allowed pterygote insects to evolve to maximum sizes during the Carboniferous and Permian periods, perhaps accelerated by an evolutionary "arms race" for increase in body size between plant-feeding Palaeodictyoptera and Meganisoptera as their predators.
Aquatic larvae stadium. Another theory suggests that insects that developed in water before becoming terrestrial as adults grew bigger as a way to protect themselves against the high levels of oxygen.

See also

References

Bibliography

External links

Picture of life sized model of Meganeura monyi made for Denver Museum of Natural History.

Meganisoptera
Pennsylvanian insects
Gzhelian life
Carboniferous invertebrates of Europe
Paleozoic insects of Europe
Fossil taxa described in 1885
Taxa named by Charles Jules Edmée Brongniart

it:Meganeura